Joanne Watmore (born 25 September 1986) is a British rugby union player. She plays for the England women's national rugby union team and for England women's national rugby sevens team. She was selected as a member of the Great Britain women's national rugby sevens team to the 2016 Summer Olympics. Watmore is England Sevens Top Try Scorer.

She played at the 2008 Women's Rugby League World Cup and at the 2013 Rugby World Cup Sevens. Watmore was picked for the final selection of Great Britain's national rugby sevens team competing at the 2016 Summer Olympics. Watmore was the first try scorer for Team GB in the 2016  Olympics. The team finished the tournament on 4th place losing against New Zealand in the semifinal and against Canada in the match for the bronze medals.

References

External links 
 
 England Player Profile

1986 births
Living people
Rugby sevens players at the 2016 Summer Olympics
England international women's rugby sevens players
Olympic rugby sevens players of Great Britain
Great Britain national rugby sevens team players